Not a Ladies' Man is a 1942 American drama film directed by Lew Landers and written by Rian James. The film stars Paul Kelly, Fay Wray, Douglas Croft, Ruth Lee, Lawrence Dixon and Marietta Canty. The film was released on May 14, 1942, by Columbia Pictures.

Plot
When district attorney Robert Bruce's wife leaves him, his son, Bill, begins to have emotional problems, which worries his teacher, Pat Hunter. Bill briefly runs away, and after getting some friendly advice from a hobo, decides to find his father a new wife. Bill's choices leave much to be desired, however. When Pat accidentally runs into Robert's car, romance ensues. Robert learns that his ex-wife has married a local racketeer, and tries to postpone the thug's trial in an attempt to spare his son the shame of having his mother wed to a gangster. This only causes more problems. Bill and Pat help Robert realize that the truth must come out, even if it hurts. Robert proposes to Pat.

Cast          
Paul Kelly as Robert Bruce
Fay Wray as Hester Hunter
Douglas Croft as Bill Bruce
Ruth Lee as Jennie Purcell
Lawrence Dixon as Pudge Roberts
Marietta Canty as Lucy
Don Beddoe as 'Professor Bigfoot' Johnson
Eileen O'Hearn as Margaret Vance
Jean Inness as Miss Morton
Louise Allbritton as Ethel Burlridge
William Wright as John Keen

References

External links
 

1942 films
American drama films
1942 drama films
Columbia Pictures films
Films directed by Lew Landers
American black-and-white films
1940s English-language films
1940s American films